The Battle of Huaqui (in some sources also called Guaqui, Yuraicoragua or Battle of Desaguadero), was a battle between the Primera Junta's (Buenos Aires) revolutionary troops and the royalist troops of the Viceroyalty of Peru on the border between Upper Peru, (present-day Bolivia), and the Viceroyalty of Peru on June 20, 1811.

Prelude 
The army commanded by Juan José Castelli and Antonio González Balcarce had their first encounter with the royalists under the command of General José Manuel de Goyeneche in October 1810. The royalist army did not press their advantage and did not pursue, and while retreating to the South, they had another encounter which they lost at Suipacha.

The successful advance of the Primera Junta's troops continued to the North of Upper Peru and on June 20, 1811 they met again near the Desaguadero River where battle ensued.

Battle progress 
On the morning of June 19, the revolutionary army had placed their troops in Huaqui, Caza, and Machaca and built a temporary bridge over the Desaguadero River moving 1,200 troops across. The aim was to distract Goyeneche's troops on their front and right flank while surrounding the royalists on their rear through the lines established by this new bridge.

General Goyeneche decided to effect a direct attack with his full force. At three in the morning of June 20, he ordered colonels Juan Ramírez and Pablo Astete, lieutenant colonels Luis Astete and Mariano Lechuga (with 350 cavalry and four cannons) to attack Caza, near the road to Machaca and communication to Huaqui, while he marched towards Huaqui with colonels Francisco Picoaga and Fermín Piérola commanding 300 cavalries, 40 guardsmen and 6 pieces of artillery.

At dawn, the heights on the hills the royalist troops needed to take were already teeming with revolutionary troops, cavalry, and fusiliers who started shooting the Spaniards along with grenades and slingshots. The royalists responded and within a few hours made the revolutionaries retreat.

When the independentist troops heard of Goyeneche's advance towards Huaqui, Castelli, Balcarce and Montes de Oca left the town with 15 artillery pieces and 2,000 men and took a strong position on the road to Huaqui between a small lake and the hills behind.

Goyeneche ordered an advance under enemy fire while colonel Picoaga's battalion covered them with return fire. The independentist troops, recognizing General Goyeneche, directed their fire towards him, and he ordered one of his aides to transmit the order to attack with his right flank, also covering the road with Piérola's battalion and detached three companies to advance on the front while he and the rest of his troops attacked through the left.

The Argentine cavalry tried to stop the push but was overrun and fled, along with the whole rebel army towards Huaqui. Goyeneche ordered pursuit and subsequently captured the town. Colonel Ramírez soon after sent a messenger informing them of victory at Caza.

The battle ended with the Argentine troops in full retreat, with more than 1000 men lost and abandoning most of their artillery. In full run they took refuge in Potosí and later on farther south in Jujuy.

Consequences 
At the same time, on June 20, 1811 a revolution that was previously prepared, started in Perú. Their leader Francisco Antonio De Zela had agreed with the Argentine troops that while he started the revolution in Tacna, the Argentine army would advance towards Peru to initiate the liberation campaign on that country, but the defeat at Huaqui stopped the plans on Peruvian territory.

The bad impression that this defeat caused in Buenos Aires, where they had lost their guns, resulted in González Balcarce and Castelli  being relieved of their commands and court-martialed. The defeat also caused a unilateral cease-fire in the siege at Montevideo due to the concern in Buenos Aires of being attacked from two fronts at the same time.

The independentist's defeat at Huaqui was of such magnitude that the weakness created in the north after the battle forced them to name General Belgrano to take control of the Army of the North and try to re-establish discipline, train the troops and wait for new armament. It forced him to take extreme measures and mobilize Northern Argentina's population in Jujuy Province towards the south before the imminent Spanish offensive. This episode is known in history as the Jujuy Exodus (Spanish:Éxodo Jujeño).

See also 

 Battle of Sipe-Sipe

Bibliography 
 Díaz Venteo, Fernando. Las campañas militares del Virrey Abascal. Sevilla, Escuela de Estudios Hispanoamericanos, 1948. 

Conflicts in 1811
Battles of the Spanish American wars of independence
Battles of the Argentine War of Independence
Battles involving Bolivia
Battles of the Bolivian War of Independence
1811 in Bolivia
June 1811 events
History of La Paz Department (Bolivia)